Carla Jenson (born July 21, 1990) is an American female volleyball player. With her club Iowa Ice she competed at the 2013 FIVB Volleyball Women's Club World Championship.

References

External links
 profile at FIVB.org
 http://www.scoresway.com/zgorzelec?sport=volleyball&page=player&id=9679

1990 births
Living people
American women's volleyball players
Place of birth missing (living people)
21st-century American women
Iowa State Cyclones women's volleyball players